Alison Brackenbury (born 1953 Gainsborough, Lincolnshire) is a British poet.

Life
After studying English at St Hugh's College, Oxford she now lives in Gloucestershire. Her work has appeared in the Kenyon Review, Ploughshares and Stand.

Awards
 Eric Gregory Award
 Poetry Book Society Recommendation.
 1994 Glen Rybertt Award
 1997 Cholmondeley Award

Works
 "In the gap"; "Affairs"; "Plucked from", The Chimera, October 2007
 "When"; "Mud"; "March ending"; "Passing", nthposition, March 2008
 "6.25", The Guardian, 2 February 2008

References

External links
 "Author's website"
 Alison Brackenbury reads poems on PoetCasting
 "Interview: Alison Brackenbury talks to Paul Stevens", The Chimaera, May 2008

Living people
1953 births
People from Gainsborough, Lincolnshire
Alumni of St Hugh's College, Oxford
English women poets
People from Gloucestershire